Labdia iolampra is a moth in the family Cosmopterigidae. It was described by Edward Meyrick in 1938. It is known from Yunnan, China.

References

Labdia
Moths described in 1938